Charles Haight (January 4, 1838 – August 1, 1891) was an American lawyer and Democratic Party politician who represented New Jersey's 2nd congressional district in the United States House of Representatives from 1867 to 1871.

Early life
Haight was born in Colts Neck Township, New Jersey, on January 4, 1838, to Thomas Haight, later a Democratic nominee for governor of New Jersey in 1847. He attended private schools in Freehold, New Jersey, and graduated from Princeton College in 1857. He studied law, was admitted to the bar in 1861 and commenced practice in Freehold.

Career
Haight was a member of the New Jersey General Assembly from 1860 to 1862 and served as speaker in 1861 and 1862. He was commissioned a brigadier general of militia on May 27, 1861, and during the American Civil War was in command of Camp Vredenburgh from August 22, 1862, until the close of the war.

Haight was elected as a Democrat to the Fortieth and Forty-first Congresses, serving in office from March 4, 1867 – March 3, 1871, but was not a candidate for renomination in 1870 to the Forty-second Congress.

After leaving Congress, he resumed the practice of law. He was a delegate to the 1872 Democratic National Convention, and served as chairman of the State delegation. He was appointed prosecutor of the pleas. He was appointed prosecuting attorney of Monmouth County in 1873 and served until his death.

Personal life
Haight was the uncle to Judge Thomas Griffith Haight.

Haight died in Freehold on August 1, 1891. He was interred in Maplewood Cemetery in Freehold.

References

External links

Charles Haight at The Political Graveyard

1838 births
1891 deaths
Democratic Party members of the United States House of Representatives from New Jersey
People from Colts Neck Township, New Jersey
Princeton University alumni
Speakers of the New Jersey General Assembly
Democratic Party members of the New Jersey General Assembly
Union militia generals
19th-century American politicians
Burials at Maplewood Cemetery, Freehold, New Jersey
Military personnel from New Jersey
New Jersey lawyers